Adam Hlobus (born 29 September 1958 as Vladimir V. Adamchyk) is a Belarusian writer, novelist, essayist, poet, publisher, and artist.

Biography 
Hlobus was born in Dzyarzhynsk Minsk Region in the family of Belarusian writer Vyacheslav Adamchyk. Him and his family moved to Minsk in 1959, where he grew up. He graduated from the pedagogical department at the Minsk Art School, and the A. K. Glebov (1977), art department of the Belarusian Theatre and Art Institute (1983). He worked as a draftsman, painter and restorer, a graphic designer, and editor of "Krynitsa", a publishing house, starting in 1987. 

He is married to Alena Adamchyk, a Belarusian photographer. He has two children and a grandson.

Activism 
He was one of the founding members of the informal association of young writers "Tuteishyja" (Tuteishyja, 1986 – 1990), which was not only a literary group but an active socio-political group as well. In particular, the union organized a protest against Stalin's repressions called "Forefathers Eve”, during which thousands of Belarusians marched, in October 1988. This became a reoccurring event for Belarusians in the following years. Member of the Writer's Union (1988) Union of Belarusian Writers (since 1989).

Creativity 
The first publications of poetry were in 1981 (Weekly "Literatura i Mastatstva", journal "Maladost"). His book "Grud" which was published in 1985 was banned and ruined by the regime representatives. Today the poems and short stories of Hlobus are translated into the major languages of the world, as well as Ossetian and Catalan and are published in the British, German, Slovenia, Czech Republic, Polish and Russian. In Russian book "Werewolves" (1991), «Demonokameron» (1993), and "Lyrics BY clause" (2007), composed of poetry translations by Russian poets of Alexander Eremenko, Alexey Parschikov, Vyacheslav Kupriyanov, Dmitry Mizgulin, and lyrical prose, translated by Svyatozar Barchenko and Alexey Andreev.

Bibliography 
 "Grud" (1985, Minsk, "Mastackaia litaratura", 64p.) The book was banned by the Soviet censorship and its circulation was destroyed.
 "Park" (1988)
 "Loneliness at the stadium" (1989)
 "Death – a man" (1992)
 "Crossroads" (1993)
 "Domovikomeron '(1994)
 "Do not tell my mom" (1995)
 "Koydanovo '(1997)
 "New domovikomeron '(1998)
 "Post scriptum" (1999)
 "Lyrics" (2000), a compilation of all previous books
 "Braslavskaya Stigmata" (2001)
 "Notebooks" (2003)
 "Home". Roman (2005)
 "Contemporaries" (2006)
 "Fairy Tales" (2007 Minsk, "Lohvinau" Publishing House, 200p. )
 "Adam Hlobus. Lyrics BY".
 "The Castle" (2008 Minsk, "Harvest" "Suchasny litaratar" 256p.) 
 "Convolutus:. Lyrics and prose" – Minsk: Suchasnyj lіtaratar, 2008. (  The eight books that have been published over the last eight years )
 "Play.By". Publisher Igor Loginov 2009
 "The New Heaven" (2010 Minsk,  "Galiafy" 192 p. )
 "The fairy Tales of Krutagorje" (2010 Minsk, "Lohvinau" Publishing House, 200p. )
 "Sentenses" (2012 Minsk, "Harvest" 736p. )
 "Names" (2013 Minsk, "Lohvinau" Publishing House, 122p.)
 "The fairy Tales About Grown-ups" (2013 Minsk, "Lohvinau" Publishing House, 200p. )
 "The Novels of Different Years" (2014 Minsk, "Lohvinau" Publishing House, 160p.)
 "Portraits" (2014 Minsk "Галіяфы", 96p. )
 "The stories of Minsk and its Surroundings" (2015 Minsk, "Lohvinau" Publishing House, 224p. )
 "Reverse Perspective" (2016 Minsk, "Harvest" 288p. )

Publications of the translations to the different languages 
 "Werewolves" (1991 Minsk, "BDPPR" 32p. art magazine ABC №1 Registration number 171), translation by Alena Adamchyk
 "Death is a man" (1993 Index on Censorship London), translation Vera Rich
 "Unser Stadtviertel" (1995, Weißrussland – die eroberte Sprache (=Ostara 4). Hannover: Rabenrat-Verlag) translation by Norbert Randow
 "Demonicameron tales" (1996 Index on Censorship London ) translation Vera Rich
 "Demonokameron" (1998 Bialystok, "ZB w Rzeczypospolitej Polskiej" ) translation Jan Maksymiuk
 "Lyrics BY" (2007 Moskou, "AST" 576p. ), translation Aleksandr Yaromenko, Alexey Parschikov, Vyacheslav Kupreyanov, Dmitriy Mizgulin, Alexey Andreev, Svyatozar Barchenko
 "Bielaruski" (2006 Minsk, "Suchasny litaratar" 161-166p. ), translation Wendy Quinn

Collective collections 
 "Local" (1989), a collection of members of the association "The Locals" (  Local  )
 "All Year Round" (1996), a collection of
 The modern Belarusian prose (2003)

Literature

External links 
 page in Livejournal
 Adam Globus reads his works 
 https://www.facebook.com/adam.hlobus

Belarusian writers
20th-century Belarusian poets
Belarusian painters
Living people
1958 births
People from Dzyarzhynsk District
Belarusian male poets
20th-century male writers
Belarusian State Academy of Arts alumni